Pauliina Aalto (born 25 November 1967) is a Finnish former Ten-pin bowling player at international level.

Biography
Aalto was born in Helsinki in 1967. Aalto took up Ten-pin bowling in 1979. She took part World contest in 1993 where she won a Gold medal for the doubles. Between 1993 and 1997 she won numerous medals including 11 gold medals. Aalto and her partner organised a contest in 2008 in Lahti in Finland where they owned a bowls shop.

References

1967 births
Living people
Sportspeople from Helsinki
Finnish ten-pin bowling players
Competitors at the 1993 World Games
World Games gold medalists
World Games medalists in bowling